"Joy Ride" is the first segment of the thirty-third episode and the ninth episode of the second season (1986–87) of the television series The Twilight Zone. In this segment, teenagers steal a car that proves to be a portal to a violent incident which took place in the 1950s.

Plot
Four teenagers (Alonzo, Greg, Adrienne, and Deena) hot-wire a classic car and go joyriding. After finding a loaded gun in the car, Alonzo, the driver, starts to become mentally consumed by the car; for instance, he knows there are cigarettes in the glove compartment. His brother Greg asks him to pull over after they notice the cars around them are 1950s models and the streets are unfamiliar.

A police car pulls them over and the officer says a local store was robbed. Greg remembers the store was torn down years ago. Alonzo shoots the officer and drives off. Adrienne is shot in the arm by the policeman's partner. Alonzo refuses to take her to the hospital but pulls into a parking lot and shoves Adrienne out of the car. Greg and Deena cannot see her anymore, and Adrienne finds her bullet wound is gone. Alonzo pulls over to let Deena out after she demands to be released.

After one last attempt to convince Alonzo to give up the dangerous joyride, Greg jumps out of the car. The car is parked right where it was when they hot-wired it. Having been alerted to the teenagers' breaking in, a rescue team has assembled. A firefighter reaches in and pulls Alonzo out of the car while another firefighter keeps him anchored. Suddenly horrified at his actions during the joyride, Alonzo says he shot a policeman. However, an officer demonstrates that there is no expended shell casing in the gun. Greg explains that Alonzo was simply reliving a getaway from 30 years ago. The car's owner, "old man Taylor", seemingly chose this supernatural illusion as his way of finally confessing to the robbery and the murder of the police officer.

External links
 

The Twilight Zone (1985 TV series season 2) episodes
1987 American television episodes
Television episodes about spirit possession
Television episodes about time travel

fr:La Balade des souvenirs